2003 World Masters Athletics Championships is the fifteenth in a series of World Masters Athletics Outdoor Championships
that took place in Carolina, Puerto Rico, from 1 to 13 July 2003.

The low participation number

may be partly due to the fear of flying after the 2001 September 11 attacks and the 2002–2004 SARS outbreak.

This is the second time that the Championships is hosted in Puerto Rico; the fifth edition of 1983 was held in San Juan.

This is the first edition of the Championships conducted after the governing body of this series was formally renamed from World Association of Veteran Athletes (WAVA) to World Masters Athletics (WMA) at the previous (2001) edition held in Brisbane, Australia,

The main venue was Pista Atletica Basilio Rodriguez

located within the Complejo Deportivo Municipal Roberto Clemente.
Other stadia included Estadio Roberto Clemente, Estadio Sixto Escobar that had hosted the 1983 Championships in San Juan, and University of Puerto Rico Sports Complex in Río Piedras.

Non-stadia venues included Central Park and Parque Julia de Burgos.

The competitions were briefly interrupted by showers from Tropical Storm Claudette.

This edition of masters athletics Championships had a minimum age limit of 35 years for women and 40 years for men.

During General Assembly on 10 July the starting age for men was reduced from 40 to 35 for subsequent editions.

Also, the inaugural 2004 Indoor Championships was approved to be held in Sindelfingen, Germany.

This Championships was organized by WMA in coordination with a Local Organising Committee (LOC) led by William Aleman.

In addition to a full range of track and field events,

non-stadia events included 8K Cross Country, 10K Race Walk (women), 20K Race Walk (men), and Marathon.

Results
A new feature for this series was the use of internet technologies:

in addition to the official website, 2 additional websites provided quick updates of competition results: flashresults

and cyberscoreboard.

Official daily results are archived at puertorico2003.

Past Championships results are archived at WMA.

Additional archives are available from Masters Athletics,

from British Masters Athletic Federation

in html and from Museum of Masters Track & Field

in html,
and as National Masters News pdf newsletters.

Several masters world records were set at this Championships. World records for 2003 are from the list of World Records in the National Masters News August newsletter unless otherwise noted.

Key:

Women

Men

References

External links

Results websites
https://www.flashresults.com/2003_Meets/outdoor/wma/index.htm
http://www.cyberscoreboard.com/report.php/Sport=1

World Masters Athletics Championships
World Masters Athletics Championships
International athletics competitions hosted by Puerto Rico
2003
Masters athletics (track and field) records